Hensley Township is a township in Champaign County, Illinois, USA.  As of the 2020 census, its population was 1,033 and it contained 464 housing units.

History
Hensley Township formed from Champaign Township in September, 1866 as Grant Township, but the name was changed to Hensley on an unknown date. Hensley Township received its name from Archibald P. Hensley (1806-1876), one of the earliest settlers of that part of the country.

Geography
Hensley is Township 20 North, Range 8 East of the Third Principal Meridian.

The source of the Kaskaskia River is located in section 19 of this township, rising from the Kaskaskia ditch. The Kaskaskia watershed drains directly into the Mississippi River.

Cities and towns
 Mahomet (east edge)

Unincorporated towns
 Rising

Cemeteries
The township contains seven cemeteries: Bethlehem , Fisher , George Peters Family, Grandview Memorial Gardens , Gregory Burial and Haines Family.

Grain elevators
The Andersons Grain and Fertilizer (Section 29), 3515 North Staley Road (County Road 800 East) opened in 1968. The Andersons grain assets were sold to Total Grain Marketing of Effingham, Illinois in September 2021. It is the largest grain elevator in Illinois with more than 16 million bushels of storage capacity.

Rising Station elevator (Section 29) was built along the Big Four—Conrail System railroad in 1917. It is operated by the Rising Farmer's Grain Company. It has the original wooden elevator and several concrete silos on Rising Road (County Road 700 East).

Major highways
  Interstate 57
  Interstate 74
  U.S. Route 150

Airports and landing strips
 Andrew RLA Airport
 Champaign Airport (historical)
 McCulley Airport (closed)

Demographics
As of the 2020 census there were 1,033 people, 355 households, and 255 families residing in the township. The racial makeup of the township was 63.31% White, 21.30% African American, 0.29% Native American, 1.26% Asian, 0.00% Pacific Islander, 4.74% from other races, and 9.10% from two or more races. Hispanic or Latino of any race were 9.29% of the population.

There were 355 households, out of which 31.00% had children under the age of 18 living with them, 57.18% were married couples living together, 12.11% had a female householder with no spouse present, and 28.17% were non-families. 16.10% of all households were made up of individuals, and 8.70% had someone living alone who was 65 years of age or older. The average household size was 2.68 and the average family size was 3.12.

The township's age distribution consisted of 23.1% under the age of 18, 7.4% from 18 to 24, 20.8% from 25 to 44, 28.8% from 45 to 64, and 20.0% who were 65 years of age or older. The median age was 41.7 years. For every 100 females, there were 103.9 males. For every 100 females age 18 and over, there were 74.5 males.

The median income for a household in the township was $71,088, and the median income for a family was $82,875. Males had a median income of $41,111 versus $27,390 for females. The per capita income for the township was $32,935. About 3.5% of families and 2.4% of the population were below the poverty line.

References
 
 United States Census Bureau cartographic boundary files

External links
 US-Counties.com
 City-Data.com
 Illinois State Archives

Townships in Champaign County, Illinois
Townships in Illinois
1866 establishments in Illinois